was a  of the Edo period, after the Jōō era and before Manji era.  This era's period spanned the years from April 1655 to July 1658. 

Change of era
 1655 : The era name was changed to mark the enthronement of Emperor Go-Sai.  The previous era ended and a new one commenced in Jōō 4, on the 13th day of the 4th month.

The source of the new era name was:
 From the Book of Han: "With the Nine Chapters of the Great Law, the five eras will be known" (大法九章、而五紀明歴法)
 From the Book of the Later Han:  "The Yellow Emperor began the passing of time, so that is why the character 歴 [passing of time] and 暦 [rhythmic cycle] are used together" (黄帝造歴、歴与暦同作)

Events of the Meireki era
 1655 (Meireki 1): The new ambassador of Korea, arrived in Japan.
 1655 (Meireki 1): The ex-Emperor went for the first time to Shugakuin Rikyū.
 March 2–3, 1657 (Meireki 3, 18th-19th days of the 1st month): The city of Edo was devastated by the Great Fire of Meireki.

Notes

References
 Nussbaum, Louis Frédéric and Käthe Roth. (2005). Japan Encyclopedia. Cambridge: Harvard University Press. ; OCLC 48943301
 Ponsonby-Fane, Richard Arthur Brabazon. (1956). Kyoto: The Old Capital of Japan, 794–1869. Kyoto: Ponsonby Memorial Society. 
 Screech, Timon. (2006). Secret Memoirs of the Shoguns: Isaac Titsingh and Japan, 1779-1822. London: RoutledgeCurzon. ; OCLC 65177072
 Titsingh, Isaac. (1834). Nihon Ōdai Ichiran; ou,  Annales des empereurs du Japon.  Paris: Royal Asiatic Society, Oriental Translation Fund of Great Britain and Ireland. OCLC 5850691

External links
 National Diet Library, "The Japanese Calendar" -- historical overview plus illustrative images from library's collection
 National Archives of Japan ...Click link for map of Edo before disastrous fire in 3rd year of Meiwa (1657)
 National Archives of Japan ...Click link for photograph of Ryogoku bridge (1875), first built over Sumida River after Meireki fire

Japanese eras
1650s in Japan